Life Is Strange 2 is an episodic graphic adventure game developed by Dontnod Entertainment and published by Square Enix. Its five episodes were released between September 2018 and December 2019 for PlayStation 4, Windows, and Xbox One and later for Linux, macOS and Nintendo Switch. A main sequel in the Life Is Strange series, the game's plot features Hispanic American brothers Sean and Daniel as they travel along the US West Coast as fugitives from the police after the younger brother discovers his telekinetic abilities. In the game, which is played from a third-person perspective, Sean must make crucial decisions that will lead to different branches in the storyline, while serving as a surrogate parent for Daniel.

Following the unexpected success of the original Life Is Strange, development of the sequel started in 2016 after the team completed the retail edition of the first game. The primary creative team behind the original returned for the sequel. The team chose a road movie structure in contrast to the original game, and was inspired by films and novels like Into the Wild and Of Mice and Men. While the game features supernatural elements, the story is mostly grounded in reality, and the team used the opportunity to explore contemporary social issues such as racism, gun violence, and bigotry. The sequel development was revealed in May 2017 and free demo, The Awesome Adventures of Captain Spirit, was released in June 2018 prior to the main game in order to introduce the new setting. Square Enix External Studios worked with Dontnod for the development.

The game received generally positive reviews upon release. Critics praised the story, the relationship between Sean and Daniel, and the choice-based gameplay, while reception of the portrayed political themes was divergent. The sparse episodic release schedule and the dialogue were criticized. It received nominations for multiple year-end accolades. The series' next main game, Life Is Strange: True Colors, which was developed by Deck Nine, was released in September 2021 and Dontnod stated to have shifted its focus to develop their own intellectual properties in May 2021.

Gameplay

Life Is Strange 2 is a graphic adventure game played from a third-person view. The player takes control of a teenager named Sean Diaz (Gonzalo Martin), who is on the run with his younger brother, Daniel (Roman Dean George), following a tragic incident. Throughout the game, the two brothers encounter various non-playable characters who interact with Sean via dialogue trees. Sean must make choices during crucial moments of the game, which lead to different branches in the storyline. Sean's actions and interactions with Daniel in particular affect Daniel's morality and the state of brotherhood between the two characters. For instance, encouraging Daniel to be rude will prompt him to swear more later in the game. Daniel will grow to resent Sean if his actions do not align with his advice, and he may no longer follow Sean's lead if he is not able to maintain an adequate level of brotherhood with Daniel. Staying morally sound and being a caring and trusting brother may not always be compatible with each other in the scenarios presented in the game. The game tracks how many players selected which option and lets the player compare their choices to the rest of the player base. While the main events of the story remain the same regardless of the player's decision, the game features several different endings.

Sean can interact with the environment and obtain objects, which can then be stored in Sean's backpack and used later. When Sean picks up an object, he will comment on them, providing players the backstory for each item and adding context to the world. Sean's backpack can also be decorated with souvenirs he collects in the world. As Sean and Daniel explore various locations, Sean can also enjoy moments of calmness at designated locations and sketch the environment around him.

Plot
In 2016, 16-year-old Sean Diaz lives with his 9-year-old brother Daniel and father Esteban (Amador Plascencia) in Seattle, after Sean's mother Karen (Jolene Andersen) left them following Daniel's birth. The day the game begins, Sean intervenes when their neighbor Brett (Robert Shearer) harasses Daniel, inadvertently injuring Brett as a police officer passes by. Esteban arrives at the scene and is shot and killed by the officer. A sudden explosion damages the environment, and Sean flees with Daniel before more police arrive. Now fugitives, Sean aims to take them to their father's Mexican hometown of Puerto Lobos. Near Mount Rainier, the brothers are recognized by the owner of a gas station, but escape with the help of travel blogger Brody Holloway (Bolen Walker). Brody arranges a motel room for the brothers, where Daniel learns of Esteban's death and becomes angry, revealing he has latent telekinetic abilities that were the cause of the explosion in Seattle.

The brothers then spend a month at an abandoned cabin, where Sean helps train Daniel's ability. After Daniel falls ill, Sean decides to take him to their maternal grandparents, Claire (Nancy Cronig) and Stephen Reynolds (John O'Connell), in nearby Beaver Creek, Oregon. At Beaver Creek, Claire and Stephen accept the brothers, despite resenting Karen's abandonment. Daniel also befriends Chris (Chandler Mantione), an imaginative boy that lives next door, after using his powers to save him from falling from his treehouse; Chris comes to think he has superpowers. Daniel coerces Sean into breaking into Karen's old room to learn more about her. The police soon arrive on word that Sean and Daniel have been sighted in public or traced by making a phone call. Claire, Stephen, and Chris then help the brothers to escape.

Sean and Daniel join freighthoppers Finn (Matthew Gallenstein) and Cassidy (Sarah J. Bartholomew) traveling to California, and the four secure paying jobs at a cannabis farm in Humboldt County, California for a cultivator named Merrill (Ben Jurand). Sean spends more time with their new friends, leaving Daniel frustrated with being unable to show his powers. One payday, Merrill discovers Daniel snooping around, resulting in Daniel revealing his powers to the others and Merrill refusing to pay the group. Finn secretly coerces or Sean accepts his plan for Daniel to use his powers to steal money from Merrill. The heist fails and Merrill threatens them with a shotgun. In a panic rage, Daniel destroys Merrill's house with his powers, knocking out everyone else and causing Sean's left eye to be impaled.

Sean wakes from a coma two months later under FBI custody. He finds a letter from Jacob (David Valdes), one of the farmworkers, which states Jacob found Daniel after the accident and took him to his hometown of Haven Point, Nevada. Sean escapes from custody and travels to Haven Point. There, he finds Daniel has been taken in by Lisbeth (Victoria Hansen), the leader of a religious cult who is presenting Daniel's powers as a divine gift to convert her followers. After an initial attempt to recover Daniel, Sean meets Karen, whom Jacob had also contacted for help. Sean and Karen begin to reconnect and establish a plan with Jacob to save him. They ultimately convince Daniel to come with them, but Karen may burn down the church in the process.

Sean and Daniel travel with Karen to the secluded community of Away, Arizona, where Sean makes the last arrangements to cross into Mexico. Sean befriends David Madsen (D.W. McCann), a former security officer from Arcadia Bay, Oregon, who suggests that Sean turn himself over to the authorities for a better outcome for him and Daniel. Authorities have tracked their location, but Karen allows her sons to escape by staying behind to be arrested. They arrive at the Mexico–United States barrier, which Daniel breaks open with his powers. Before they can cross, Daniel is wounded by a bullet from two vigilantes, and the group is soon captured by the local police. Daniel breaks Sean out of interrogation and the two flee to a Mexican port of entry, but find it blockaded by FBI and United States Border Patrol agents.

Sean must decide whether to surrender or attempt to cross the border, with the outcome depending on whether he raised Daniel with high or low societal morality through his past choices. If Sean chooses to surrender, he is either taken into custody while Daniel lives with Claire and Stephen before a reunion fifteen years later after Sean is released from prison, or he is killed when Daniel forces them to cross the border which causes Daniel to grow up in Puerto Lobos alone and become a career criminal. If Sean chooses to cross the border, he will cross into Mexico with help from Daniel, who then either surrenders to the FBI and lives with Claire and Stephen while Sean lives in Puerto Lobos either alone or with Cassidy or Finn, or stays with Sean in crossing the border where the brothers open a garage in Puerto Lobos like their father had and use Daniel's powers to become career criminals.

Development
Life Is Strange 2 was developed by French developer Dontnod Entertainment, which started the game's production after it shipped the retail edition of the first game in 2016. It was decided early that the sequel would feature a cast of new characters, with director Michel Koch likening the franchise to TV series such as True Detective or American Horror Story in 2015. The development team believed that the franchise was about common people that players can relate to, and stories that are grounded in reality and reflective of the player's own experience. By introducing new characters, the team can try something different and explore different themes. According to the team, the story of Max and Chloe (the protagonists of the first game) has already been completed. David, a returning character, makes a small appearance in Episode 5. The team included him in the sequel because he always survives the events of the first game and that through him, players can discover "little hints" regarding the fate of Max and Chloe. The team avoids giving too many details about their fates, as the first game does not have a canon ending and featuring them too heavily in the story may displease fans who are heavily invested in fan fiction. David's appearance helps connect the sequel to the first game without confusing new audiences.

Unlike the first game, which is set in one place, Life Is Strange 2 is structured like a road movie. The team did not want to develop a retread of the first game, and wanted the sequel to significantly deviate from the original's formula. The team was inspired by films and novels such as Into the Wild, Stand By Me, Of Mice and Men, and On the Road. Dontnod conducted field research on the West Coast of the United States, meeting people and taking pictures. The drifters (Finn and Cassidy) featured in the game were inspired by the photography of Mike Brodie, a freighthopper who took photos of the people he had encountered throughout his journey, and his book A Period of Juvenile Prosperity. In particular, his series of photos about a child who grew up on the road served as the foundation of the game's characters who become "outcasts living on the outskirts of society". The team hoped that through exploring their stories, they can show players that there are many ways for people to live their lives.
 
Writing the characters was a challenge for lead writer Jean Luc-Cano. Unlike the first game, which gives an ample amount of time for characters to develop, characters in the sequel have to be introduced quickly due to the road film structure. The players must decide if they should trust these characters within a short period of time. Like the first game, animal symbolism is featured heavily in this game, as the team believed that these animal symbols and metaphors help to "[bring] something visual for players". The story was first written in French by a team led by Cano, and the script was then passed to American writer Christian Divine who helped refine its tone and accuracy.

One of the game's main themes is education: Sean must be a role model for Daniel, who will learn from Sean and follow what he does. Ultimately, Daniel's actions and personality are tied to the player's decisions throughout the game. While Daniel's telekinetic powers are not the game's focus, its inclusion allows players to understand the consequences of their actions, such as how Daniel utilizes his powers is directly linked to how Sean nurtures him. The game's ending is reflective of what Daniel learns from Sean throughout the five episodes. The team did not create a perfect ending for the characters because such an ending is often non-existent in the real world. To ensure that the educational aspect of the game is genuine, the team read books and documents produced by psychologists and sociologists to gain more insight. The team also spent an extensive amount of time developing Daniel's artificial intelligence to ensure that he is "believable, sensible, and sometimes super-cute". The developers recognised that brotherly bonding is rarely perfect and relationships between siblings can be tense. Sean, as a teenager, wants to find people around him to develop his own life and does not want his younger brother around him. Throughout the game, players need to balance Sean's personal interests, like spending time with the new characters Sean meets, with caring for Daniel. The team spent a lot of time finding the right balance to ensure that the relationship between the two brothers are not obnoxious and that players do not grow to dislike Sean as the story progresses. Cano used his own personal experience interacting with his elder brother and daughter while developing the brotherhood relationship between Sean and Daniel, as well as the educational aspect of the game.

As the story is grounded in reality, the team explored various real-world social issues such as racism, alcoholism, gun violence, and bigotry. While the game takes place in the United States, director Raoul Barbet states that these problems are universal and their depictions in the game allow players to reflect on their own experiences. He adds that the team did not want to "gamify a difficult subject", and worked to ensure that characters evolve naturally throughout the story. Superpowers were included to add a sense of urgency. The team wanted the story to inspire players to "talk more to other people when they meet someone that's different from them". They also hoped that players would ultimately feel a sense of loss when the story concludes, as they would have related to the experiences of Sean and Daniel. The team worked to show that the world is a violent one, as they believed that brotherhood between the two protagonists can develop as they face various adversities together. Homelessness is also one of the game's main themes, and the team consulted various charity organisations to ensure that its portrayal was accurate. In November 2019, Square Enix collaborated with charity Centrepoint for their We Will Be Heard campaign about awareness of services for young homeless people.

The game also introduces various gameplay improvements. Players are no longer locked in a cutscene while interacting with people or objects, and Sean can now walk around while conversing with others. The game uses Unreal Engine 4 and has improved lip syncing and facial animation compared to the original. Jonathan Morali returned to compose the score for the sequel. The music contains both original and licensed tracks. Licensed tracks include, among others, songs from Phoenix, The Streets, Sufjan Stevens, and First Aid Kit.

Release

The developers announced that Dontnod was working on a new Life Is Strange game on 18 May 2017 via a short video. Prior to the reveal of the game, free demo game, The Awesome Adventures of Captain Spirit, was released on 25 June 2018, which served as an introduction to the new scenario and features a character from the game named Chris. The game was officially unveiled at Gamescom on 20 August 2018 by publisher Square Enix along the release date of the first episode, which adopted an episodic format similar to the first game. Microsoft announced the game's first episode to be become available to Xbox Game Pass subscribers on Xbox consoles in January 2019, with the other episodes following soon after. In March 2019, Dontnod explained the game had a more complicated development due to its road film structure, as each episode features a new set of characters and new environments. They could not reuse assets created for earlier episodes, and had to organize auditions and castings for each episode. The episodes took longer to develop when compared to the first game, resulting in a more sparse release schedule, which the team believed may have affected players' investment in the story and the characters, possibly resulting in a more muted audience response when compared to the first game. Retail editions of the game were released in Europe on 3 December 2019 and in North America on 4 February 2020. Feral Interactive released all five episodes for Linux and macOS on 19 December 2019. On 18 September 2020, Episode 1: Roads was made free for all platforms. A Nintendo Switch port was released on 2 February 2023.

Reception

Critical reception

The game received "generally positive reviews"—except for PC version, which was met with "mixed or average reviews"—according to review aggregator Metacritic. Its portrayal of Hispanic Americans and relation to racial issues in the US was debated in media articles.

The game's themes received generally positive reviews. In their complete season review, The Verge's Andrew Webster described the game as a powerful and compelling experience, and believed that it is a rare video game that tackles the realities of modern life. Webster described the game as a "powerful statement about American politics during a very tense time". Washington Posts Elise Favis lauded its incorporation of political themes for enriching the story and prompting players to empathize with the characters, adding that it brings "a nuance to the world and a reflection of the real lives of others in modern America". Caty McCarthy from USgamer described the game as an earnest attempt by Dontnod to explore contemporarily American social issues, but she was disappointed by its execution. She added that as the season progresses, the exploration of these issues becomes formulaic. Alistair Jones from PC Gamer believed that the game's focus on political and social issues compromised its central themes, such as family and brotherhood. Gita Jackson from Kotaku praised the game for being heartfelt, adding that in each episode, the game "pleads with you to care about the kinds of people you’d normally overlook". However, Joe Juba from Game Informer described the side characters as stereotypical, and remarked that some of the encounters were "contrived".

The game's story received generally positive reviews from critics. McCarthy remarked that the game is at its best when Daniel and Sean are bonding with each other. While she lamented that other side characters have limited roles, she was able to relate to the experiences of the two brothers and often eagerly anticipated where the story takes them. She further praised the choice-based gameplay for being "tangible", as Daniel's behaviors and actions are the embodiment of the choices Sean has made. Joshua Rivera, also from Kotaku, described the game as a "heartbreakingly accurate brotherhood simulator" due to the educational themes in the game. Ozzie Mejia from Shacknews described the education aspect of the game as its most captivating element. He praised how small choices contributed to the game's endings, and remarked that it was a significant improvement over the first game. Tom Phillips, writing for Eurogamer, also enjoyed guiding the two characters throughout the season, adding that each plot thread helps enhance and progress Daniel and Sean' relationship. According to Phillips, the game "marks a more intimate and accomplished return for a studio keen to tackle tough issues with honest characters". VentureBeats Dean Takahashi likewise applauded the character and the setting, calling them real and interesting, but remarked that Daniel has an annoying personality. Jones, however, believed that the road trip structure rendered most of the choices made within an episode meaningless, as Sean and Daniel will move on from a location and most characters would not be seen again. He was also critical of the main gameplay mechanic being effectively out of the player's hands.

Webster enjoyed the quiet scenes featured in the game and applauded Dontnod for finding a balance between drama and peaceful moments. He added that this pacing made the game "powerful without being exhausting". Dylan Burns from IGN agreed, adding that by slowing down the story to offer times that are more contemplative, the game manages to create beautiful and memorable moments. Takahashi, however, remarked that the slow moments can be so slow that they grind the game to a halt. Jackson noted that the dialogue was a marked improvement over the first game, though it still had the original's "almost embarrassing earnestness", while Meija praised the voice cast for making the most out of a script that can occasionally be "cheesy". Juba remarked the dialogue and the performance can be "stilted" at times, though it did not stop him from caring for Sean and Daniel. He further applauded Dontnod for successfully creating relatable characters. Jones believed that the sparse episodic release format was detrimental to the game's narrative pacing, remarking that much of the story happens off-screen, and it can be difficult for players to remain engaged.

Heather Wald of GamesRadar+ said Episode 1 was a "slow start", its well-constructed moments do not "hang together particularly well". In response to Episode 2, GameStars Maurice Weber said the episode did not have enough momentum to delight him, while having dramatic story elements and difficult decisions in the right moments. He views the success of the game's predecessor as the game's biggest issue, as it does not consistently play in its class. Writing for Game Informer, Elise Favis said Episode 3 has an explosive conclusion but "painfully stereotypical" characters and poor pacing. GameSpots Jess McDonell said Episode 4 has exceptional character development, but its storyline feels cliche and the villain "two-dimensional". JeuxVideo said the final episode is strong and while having at least as much contemplation as interactivity, swings between pure levity and the worst of humanity.

Sales

The PlayStation 4 version of Life is Strange 2 was the fifteenth bestselling retail game during its first week of release in Japan, with 4,471 physical copies being sold.

Accolades

Future

In a December 2019 interview, Dontnod's developers expressed interest in the future of the franchise while noting they would opt for new characters again, but explained that the rights belong to Square Enix and that decisions on the future of the franchise lay with them. Dontnod has since shifted their focus to develop their own intellectual properties in recent years according to a May 2021 interview. The series' next main entry, Life Is Strange: True Colors, was developed by Life Is Strange: Before the Storm developer Deck Nine and was released non-episodically in September 2021.

References
Notes

References

External links

2018 video games
Adventure games
Episodic video games
Interactive movie video games
LGBT-related video games
Life Is Strange
Linux games
Nintendo Switch games
PlayStation 4 games
PlayStation Network games
Single-player video games
Square Enix games
Unreal Engine games
Video game sequels
Video games developed in France
Video games scored by Jonathan Morali
Video games set in 2016
Video games set in Arizona
Video games set in California
Video games set in Mexico
Video games set in Nevada
Video games set in Oregon
Video games set in Seattle
Video games set in Washington (state)
Windows games
Xbox One games
Dontnod Entertainment
Feral Interactive games
Video games with alternate endings